Paralogania is an extinct genus of thelodonti fish that is known from the Upper Silurian geological period (Wenlock / Ludlow); the best fossil deposits are from the Baltic Sea region, but it is widespread in the Northern Hemisphere.

References

Thelodonti genera
Silurian animals
Prehistoric life of Europe